The 2007 Mount Union Purple Raiders Football team represented the University of Mount Union in the 2007 NCAA Division III football season. Led by veteran head coach Larry Kehres, with future NFL wide receivers Pierre Garçon and Cecil Shorts III, The Raiders completed their second consecutive undefeated regular season. The Raiders battled to the Stagg Bowl National Championship for the third consecutive year, but unlike the previous two years, the Raiders were defeated by UW-Whitewater. After the season, Garçon was be drafted in the sixth round of the NFL Draft by the Indianapolis Colts, for whom he started in Super Bowl XLIV, before being traded to the Washington Redskins and San Francisco 49ers. Shorts entered the NFL in 2011 for the Jacksonville Jaguars.

Schedule

References

Mount Union
Mount Union Purple Raiders football seasons
Mount Union Purple Raiders football